The NFL 1990s All-Decade Team was chosen by voters of the Pro Football Hall of Fame. The team was composed of outstanding performers in the National Football League in the 1990s. 

The squad consists of first- and second-team offensive, defensive and special teams units, as well as a first- and second-team head coaches. Only a person's performance in the 1990s was used as criteria for voting.

Bruce Matthews, Jerry Rice, Barry Sanders, Bruce Smith and Reggie White were unanimous choices. Deion Sanders and Mel Gray were the only players to make the team at two positions. Sanders was named first-team cornerback and punt returner while Gray made the second team as both a kick and punt returner. Morten Andersen, Gary Anderson, Sean Landeta, Ronnie Lott, Gary Zimmerman, Jerry Rice, Bruce Smith, and Reggie White were first named to the 1980s All-Decade Team. Larry Allen, Warren Sapp, and Willie Roaf were also named to the 2000s All-Decade Team.

Offense

Defense

Special teams

Coach

References

National Football League All-Decade Teams
National Football League records and achievements
Foot
Foot
Foot
National Football League lists